Jamie Peck FRSC FAcSS (born July 9, 1962 in Kimberley, Nottinghamshire, UK) is Canada Research Chair in Urban & Regional Political Economy and Professor of Geography at the University of British Columbia, Canada. He is the Managing Editor of Environment and Planning A and the convenor of the Summer Institute in Economic Geography.

Background

The recipient of Guggenheim and Harkness fellowships, he was previously Professor of Geography & Sociology at the University of Wisconsin-Madison and Professor of Geography at the University of Manchester, and has held visiting positions at Johns Hopkins University, Oxford University, the National University of Singapore, University of the Witwatersrand, the University of Melbourne, the University of Nottingham, the University of Amsterdam, the University of Oslo, and Queen's University Belfast.

Scholarly Contributions
Jamie Peck's research interests include the political economy of neoliberalization, policy mobility, economic governance, labor market theory and policy, and urban restructuring. His publications include Fast policy: experimental statecraft at the thresholds of neoliberalism (2015, with Nik Theodore), Constructions of neoliberal reason (2010), Contesting neoliberalism: urban frontiers (2007, coedited with Helga Leitner & Eric Sheppard), Politics and practice in economic geography (2007, coedited with Adam Tickell, Eric Sheppard & Trevor Barnes), Workfare states (2001), Work-place: the social regulation of labor markets (1996), and the Wiley-Blackwell companion to economic geography (2012, coedited with Trevor Barnes & Eric Sheppard). His current research is concerned with the sociology of global outsourcing, the politics of labor in the American South, and the political economy of urban restructuring.

Recognition
 Ellen Churchill Semple award, Department of Geography, University of Kentucky, 2008
 Fellow of the Royal Society of Canada
 Fellow of the Academy of the Social Sciences
 Fellow, John Simon Guggenheim Memorial Foundation (2006-2007)
 Back Award, Royal Geographical Society, for "contributions to new economic geography"
 Harkness Fellow, Commonwealth Fund of New York (1995-1996)

References

External links
 
 Entrevista com Jamie Peck - Boletim Campineiro de Geografia, n. 2, v. 2, 2012 

British geographers
Urban theorists
Alumni of the University of Manchester
University of Wisconsin–Madison faculty
Academic staff of the University of British Columbia
Fellows of the Academy of Social Sciences
Fellows of the Royal Society of Canada
Living people
1962 births
Economic geographers
People from Kimberley, Nottinghamshire
Canada Research Chairs